Marshall Livingston Shearer Sr. (August 30, 1901 – May 13, 1964) was an American football coach.   He served as the head football coach at New River State College—now known as West Virginia University Institute of Technology—in Montgomery, West Virginia for one season, in 1934, compiling a record of 0–5.

He was previously the head coach at Concord University where he had a 1–12–2 record from 1930 to 1931, and he also coached for one year at Bluefield College in 1926 with a 1–3–1 record.

After that, he was a head coach at Graham High School in Bluefield, Virginia where he coached future college and pro football Hall of Fame member Bill Dudley.

Shearer was born in Wayne County, Kentucky in 1901 and died in North Charleston, South Carolina 1964.

At Centre College, he was a part of the football team, a teammate of Red Roberts.

References

External links
 

1901 births
1964 deaths
American football tackles
Bluefield Rams football coaches
Centre Colonels football players
Concord Mountain Lions football coaches
West Virginia Tech Golden Bears football coaches
People from Wayne County, Kentucky